The Pösgraben is a river of Saxony, Germany. It flows into the Threne near Zweenfurth.

See also
List of rivers of Saxony

References 

Rivers of Saxony
Rivers of Germany